Holtham mat refer to:

The deserted medieval village of Holtham in Lincolnshire
Katie Holtham (born 9 April 1986), English footballer
Nicholas Holtam (born 8 August 1954), a bishop of the Church of England. 
Holtham Commission, a UK commission tasked to investigate distribution of funds to the Welsh state